"Never Surrender" is a song recorded by Belgian/Dutch Eurodance band 2 Unlimited. It was released as the third and final single from them to feature Romy van Oojen and Marjon van Iwaarden as the lead vocalists. It was also the third and final single to be taken from 2 Unlimited's fourth studio album, II. The single scored moderate chart success on the Eurochart Hot 100 at #40, #5 in Spain and #23 in Belgium. "Never Surrender" did not obtain a UK release, unlike the previous single "Edge of Heaven".

Music video
The music video for "Never Surrender" was directed by Jon Bont.

Track listing
 Belgian CD single
 "Never Surrender" (Radio Edit) (3:55)
 "Never Surrender" (Extended) (6:22)

 Spanish CD maxi
 "Never Surrender" (Radio Edit) (3:55)
 "Never Surrender" (Extended) (6:22)
 "Never Surrender" (Perpetual Motion Remix) (8:01)
 "Never Surrender" (Milk Inc. Remix) (5:26)
 "Never Surrender" (Unlimited Mix) (6:51)
 "Never Surrender" (Unlimited Dub Mix) (4:46)
 "Never Surrender" (AJ Duncan's Wild Side Remix) (6:40)

 Belgian and Spanish 12" maxi
 "Never Surrender" (Perpetual Motion Remix) (8:01)
 "Never Surrender" (Milk Inc. Remix) (5:26)
 "Never Surrender" (Unlimited Mix) (6:51)
 "Never Surrender" (Unlimited Dub Mix) (4:46)
 "Never Surrender" (AJ Duncan's Wild Side Remix) (6:40)

Charts

References

1998 singles
2 Unlimited songs
Electronic songs
Eurodance songs
1998 songs
Songs written by Phil Wilde
Songs written by Peter Bauwens
Byte Records singles